Seven Natural Wonders is an organization that was created with the mission of protecting and promoting the natural wonders of the world. The project was launched in 2008 in response to the New 7 Wonders efforts to change the natural wonders of the world. This announcement was made following the campaign's efforts to establish a new list of modern man-made wonders.

Seven Natural Wonders launched an effort to expand the 7 Natural Wonders of the World by creating campaigns to add the Seven natural Wonders for each continent.  These campaigns differed from the efforts of New 7 Wonders because every wonder of nature was eligible with no requirements for entry fees and sponsorship fees of any kind.  This campaign was further distinguished by avoiding the influence of marketing, advertising and social media, with the winning wonders being determined by experts from around the world who leveraged statistical and traditional significance, uniqueness, and pure splendor.

Seven Natural Wonders was established to protect the original vision and declaration of the seven natural wonders of the world. Their list of the natural wonders includes:
 Aurora Borealis (also known as the northern lights)
 Harbor of Rio de Janeiro
 Grand Canyon
 Great Barrier Reef
 Mount Everest
 Victoria Falls
 Parícutin, Mexico
The mission of Seven Natural Wonders is to promote and protect the natural wonders.

See also
New7Wonders of Nature
Wonders of the World

References

Nature conservation organizations based in the United States